Kalan Kalayeh (also Romanized as Kalān Kalāyeh and Kalan Kalāyeh) is a village in Machian Rural District, Kelachay District, Rudsar County, Gilan Province, Iran. At the 2006 census, its population was 532, in 144 families.

References 

Populated places in Rudsar County